Kenneth Fleming Williams III (born November 18, 1996) is an American professional basketball player for AEK Athens of the Greek Basket League and the Basketball Champions League. He played college basketball for the North Carolina Tar Heels.

College career
Born and raised in the Richmond, Virginia area, Williams originally committed to play for coach Shaka Smart at nearby Virginia Commonwealth University (VCU). When Smart left VCU for the University of Texas, Williams re-opened his recruitment, eventually choosing the University of North Carolina. As a sophomore, he was a part of the Tar Heels' 2016–17 national championship team. Williams started 22 games before being injured in a February 15 game against NC State, causing him to sit out the remainder of the season.

Williams enjoyed his best college season as a junior, where he averaged 11.4 points per game, including 20 in a rivalry win over Duke. As a senior, Williams was named a captain by head coach Roy Williams.

Professional career

Austin Spurs (2019–2021) 
After going undrafted in the 2019 NBA draft, Williams signed with the San Antonio Spurs for the 2019 NBA Summer League hosted at Vivint Smart Home Arena. After being cut, he was added to the roster of the Spurs' NBA G League affiliate, the Austin Spurs. On March 6, 2020, Williams scored 31 points in a 117-114 overtime win against the Northern Arizona Suns. In 15 games, he averaged 11 points, 4.5 rebounds and 1.8 assists.

Bnei Herzliya (2021)
On April 13, 2021, Williams signed with Bnei Rav-Bariach Herzliya of the Israeli Ligat Winner Sal.

Kolossos Rodou (2021–2022)
On August 17, 2021, Williams signed with Greek club Kolossos Rodou. In 25 games, he averaged 12.7 points, 3.6 rebounds, 2.2 assists and 1.3 steals, playing around 32 minutes per contest.

AEK Athens (2022–present)
On July 9, 2022, Williams signed with AEK Athens, following his Kolossos Rodou coach Ilias Kantzouris.

Career statistics

College

|-
| style="text-align:left;"| 2015–16
| style="text-align:left;"| North Carolina
| 29 || 0 || 4.2 || .364 || .077 || 1.000 || .4 || .2 || .1 || .0 || .8
|-
| style="text-align:left;"| 2016–17
| style="text-align:left;"| North Carolina
| 26 || 22 || 23.7 || .417 || .338 || .633 || 3.3 || 2.2 || .9 || .3 || 6.2
|-
| style="text-align:left;"| 2017–18
| style="text-align:left;"| North Carolina
| 37 || 36 || 31.1 || .486 || .402 || .704 || 3.7 || 2.4 || 1.0 || .5 || 11.4
|-
| style="text-align:left;"| 2018–19
| style="text-align:left;"| North Carolina
| 36 || 36 || 30.0 || .399 || .295 || .797 || 3.9 || 3.5 || .9 || .3 || 8.6
|- class="sortbottom"
| style="text-align:center;" colspan="2"| Career
| 128 || 94 || 23.2 || .439 || .342 || .740 || 2.9 || 2.2 || .8 || .3 || 7.1

G-League 

|-
| style="text-align:left;"| 
| style="text-align:left;"| Austin
| 39 || 14 || 22.5 || .387 || .296 ||.84 || 2.7 || 2.1 || .7 || .2 || 7.5
|-
| style="text-align:center;" colspan="2"| Career
| 39 || 14 || 22.5 || .387 || .296 ||.84 || 2.7 || 2.1 || .7 || .2 || 7.5

References

External links
North Carolina Tar Heels bio

1996 births
Living people
AEK B.C. players
American expatriate basketball people in Greece
American expatriate basketball people in Israel
American men's basketball players
Austin Spurs players
Basketball players from Richmond, Virginia
Kolossos Rodou B.C. players
North Carolina Tar Heels men's basketball players
Shooting guards